The 2005 Rugby League Tri-Nations was played in Great Britain and Australasia. The final was played between Australia and New Zealand at Elland Road on Saturday 26 November. New Zealand won the match 24-0 and were crowned 2005 Tri-Nations champions, breaking Australia's 27-year undefeated international tournament record.

The tournament was officially known as the 2005 Gillette Tri-Nations due to sponsorship from Gillette.


Participating teams 
Each team was to play the other three twice during the round robin tournament. The top two finishing teams would then contest the final.

Officials 
One referee from each participating nation was appointed to control matches in the Tri-Nations:
  Tim Mander (2 matches)
  Steve Ganson (4 matches)
  Glen Black (1 match)

Venues 
The games were played at the following venues in Australia, New Zealand and England.

Final 
The Tri-Nations Final was played in Leeds.

Results

Tournament matches 

 Australia were without their captain Darren Lockyer for this match and the remainder of the tournament after he injured his foot at training.

Tournament standings

Final 

The historic win by the Kiwis over an Australian 17 containing only 3 Queensland players and one player from the previous month's 2005 NRL grand final put an end to the Kangaroos' dominance in international rugby league. It was the first time Australia, hot favourites for the match, had failed to win a series or tournament since France defeated them in both Tests of the 1978 Kangaroo tour.

The win by New Zealand was the first time the Kiwis had beaten Australia in a test series or tournament (not including one-off test wins in 1971, 1987 and 1998) since 1952. Australian coach Wayne Bennett resigned from the national coaching post just over a week after the final.

Player statistics

Non-series tests 
During the series, Australia and New Zealand played additional Tests against France. This was the first time the two teams had met in a test match since Australia's 74–0 win in Béziers in the last game of the 1994 Kangaroo tour.

For this match, Craig Gower was given the honour of captaining Australia for the first time.

Australia 44 (A Minichiello 2, T Waterhouse 2, M Cooper, S Prince, C Gower, W Mason tries; S Prince 6 goals) defeated
France 12 (L Frayssinous, M Gresqueu tries; L Frayssinous 2 goals)

Other game 
New Zealand played a midweek match against England "A" which did not count as a test match. Halftime was 12-all.

See also 
 2005 NRL season
 Super League X

References

Further reading

External links 
 Kiwis overcome critics to down Kangaroos in Tri-Nations opener – kangaroos.leagueunlimited.com
 2005 Tri-nations final at trinations.rlfans.com
 2005 Tri-nations at rlhalloffame.org.uk
 New Zealand Test teams 2005 at nzrl.co.nz

Rugby League Tri-Nations
Rugby League Tri-Nations
Tri-Nations
Rugby League Tri-Nations
Rugby League Tri-Nations
International rugby league competitions hosted by the United Kingdom